The York River Formation is a geologic formation in Quebec. It preserves fossils dating back to the Devonian period.

Description

The basal unit of the Gaspé Sandstones, the York River Formation is wholly marine and the Battery Point Formation rests unconformably above it.

Fossil content

Vertebrates

Invertebrates

See also

 List of fossiliferous stratigraphic units in Quebec

References

 

Devonian Quebec
Oil shale in Canada
Oil shale formations